The Lititz Watch Technicum is a watchmaking school located in Lititz, Pennsylvania.  The school, founded by Rolex in 2001, was created to help make up for the deficiency of skilled watchmakers in the US.

The Technicum offers a two-year, 3000+ hour SAWTA (Swiss American Watchmaker's Training Alliance) curriculum.  Tuition is free for the 14 students accepted each year.  The students are expected to pay for their tools which, according to the school, currently cost around $7000.  The program focuses on micromechanics and watch service with a strong emphasis on chronographs.

References

Rolex
Lititz, Pennsylvania
Education in Lancaster County, Pennsylvania
Watchmakers
Buildings and structures in Lancaster County, Pennsylvania